M156 is a rear wheel drive automobile platform developed by Maserati for use in a range of vehicles in the Fiat group. It underpins the 2013 Maserati Quattroporte, as well as the 2013 Maserati Ghibli and 2016 Maserati Levante (in the latter two's shortened version, named "M157"). It uses four-wheel independent suspension, composed of double wishbones at the front and a multilink setup at the rear, and supports all wheel drive.

References

M156